Masterwort is a common name for several plants in the family Apiaceae and may refer to:

Astrantia, a genus with several plant species cultivated as ornamentals
Heracleum, a genus of plants known for their phototoxic effects
Peucedanum ostruthium, a species used as an herbal flavoring
Aegopodium podagraria, a species that is sometimes called English masterwort or wild masterwort